Pallor is a pale color of the skin that can be caused by illness, emotional shock or stress, stimulant use, or anemia, and is the result of a reduced amount of oxyhaemoglobin and may also be visible as pallor of the conjunctivae of the eyes on physical examination.

Pallor is more evident on the face and palms. It can develop suddenly or gradually, depending on the cause. It is not usually clinically significant unless it is accompanied by a general pallor (pale lips, tongue, palms, mouth and other regions with mucous membranes). It is distinguished from similar presentations such as hypopigmentation (lack or loss of skin pigment) or simply a fair complexion.

Causes
 migraine attack or headache
 excess estradiol and/or estrone
 osteoporosis
 emotional response, due to fear, embarrassment, grief, rage
 anorexia
 anemia, due to blood loss, poor nutrition, or underlying disease such as sickle cell anemia
 iron deficiency
 vitamin B12 deficiency
 shock, a medical emergency caused by illness or injury
 acute compartment syndrome
 frostbite
 common cold
 cancer
 hypoglycaemia
bradycardia
 panic attack
 medications
 ketorolac
amphetamines
ethanol
cannabis
 lead poisoning
 motion sickness
 heart disease
 Peripheral vascular disease
 hypothyroidism
 hypopituitarism
 scurvy
 tuberculosis
 sleep deprivation
 pheochromocytoma
 squeamishness
 visceral larva migrans
 Orthostatic hypotension
 methyldopa
 loss of appetite
 Space adaptation syndrome
 fibromyalgia
 Buerger's disease
Hypovolemia

References

External links 

Medical signs
Dermatologic terminology
Symptoms and signs: Skin and subcutaneous tissue